The Scene Changes was Perry Como's 12th RCA Victor 12" long-play album.

The Scene Changes is a Perry Como concept album where all the songs are country and feature the "Nashville sound". It was produced by RCA Victor's Nashville studio's producer Chet Atkins. He was accompanied by The Anita Kerr Quartet. It included two early Willie Nelson compositions and a recent Top 30 Como single, "Dream On Little Dreamer".

Track listing
Side One:
"Where Does a Little Tear Come From?" (Words and Music by Marge Barton and Fred MacRae)
"Funny How Time Slips Away" (Words and Music by Willie Nelson)
"Here Comes My Baby" (Words and Music by Bill West and Dottie West)
"Sweet Adorable You" (Words and Music by Thomas Baker Knight)
"I Really Don't Want To Know" (Music by Don Robertson and lyrics by Howard Barnes)
"That Ain't All" (Words and Music by John D. Loudermilk)

Side Two:
"Dream On Little Dreamer" (Words and Music by Jan Crutchfield and Fred Burch)
"Stand Beside Me" (Words and Music by Tompall Glaser)
"A Hatchet, A Hammer, A Bucket of Nails" (Words and Music by Sarah Graham, Richard Ahlert and Eddie Snyder)
"Gringo's Guitar" (Words and Music by Cindy Walker)
"My Own Peculiar Way" (Words and Music by Willie Nelson)
"Give Myself a Party" (Words and Music by Don Gibson)

References

External links

Perry Como albums
1965 albums
RCA Victor albums
Albums produced by Chet Atkins